Oliwer Kaski (born 4 September 1995) is a Finnish professional ice hockey defenceman who currently plays for HV71 of the Swedish Hockey League (SHL). Prior to turning professional, Kaski became the first Finnish-born player to play for the Western Michigan Broncos. His father Olli was also a professional ice hockey player for fifteen years, eleven of them with the Liiga's Ässät.

Playing career
Kaski played for Western Michigan University for two seasons, becoming the first player born in Finland to play for Western Michigan. In November 2016, his sophomore year at Western Michigan, Kaski signed with HIFK of the Finnish Elite League (Liiga). After playing parts of two seasons with HIFK, Kaski signed with the Lahti Pelicans in April 2018.

During the 2018–19 season, Kaski had a breakout year. He recorded 19 goals and 32 assists in 59 games, leading the Pelicans in scoring. Kaski was awarded the Lasse Oksanen trophy as the league's best player.

On 28 May 2019, Kaski signed as an undrafted free agent to a one-year, entry-level contract with the Detroit Red Wings.

After attending the Red Wings training camp, Kaski was assigned to begin the 2019–20 season with AHL affiliate, the Grand Rapids Griffins. In his first North American professional season, Kaski contributed with 2 goals and 5 points through 19 games before on 12 December 2019, Kaski was traded by the Red Wings to the Carolina Hurricanes in exchange for Kyle Wood. Kaski found his scoring touch with AHL affiliate, the Charlotte Checkers, registering 11 goals in just 35 games from the blueline.

As an impending restricted free agent with the Hurricanes, Kaski opted to leave North America in agreeing to a one-year contract with Russian club, Avangard Omsk of the KHL on 18 June 2020.

In March 2022, Kaski left Avangard Omsk during playoffs due to the Russian invasion of Ukraine.

As a free agent, Kaski moved to Switzerland in the off-season, signing a two-year contract with Swiss club, HC Lugano of the National League (NL) on 25 May 2022. In the 2022–23 season, Kaski struggled to adapt with Lugano, registering just 4 assists through 20 games. On 13 December 2022, Kaski opted to leave Switzerland to immediately join HV71 of the SHL on a two-year deal.

Career statistics

Regular season and playoffs

International

Awards and honours

References

External links
 

1995 births
Living people
Avangard Omsk players
Charlotte Checkers (2010–) players
Finnish ice hockey defencemen
Grand Rapids Griffins players
HIFK (ice hockey) players
HV71 players
Kiekko-Vantaa players
Lahti Pelicans players
HC Lugano players
Sportspeople from Pori
Western Michigan Broncos men's ice hockey players
21st-century Finnish people